The Eppstein school shooting was a school shooting that occurred on 3 June 1983 at the Freiherr-vom-Stein Gesamtschule in Eppstein-Vockenhausen, West Germany. The gunman, 34-year-old Karel Charva, fatally shot three students, a teacher and a police officer and injured another 14 people using two semi-automatic pistols, before committing suicide.

The shooting is the eighth-deadliest of its kind in post-war Germany, after the Erfurt massacre in 2002, the Winnenden school shooting in 2009, the Cologne school massacre in 1964, the 2020 Hanau shootings, the 2016 Munich shooting, the Fahrdorf massacre in 1970 and the 2020 Rot am See shooting.

Shooting
At about 7:20 a.m. Charva rented a VW panel van at a car rental agency in Frankfurt am Main and is supposed to have driven through the area in search for a school that gave lessons that day, as many were closed due to a holiday. Thus, it is assumed, it was pure chance that he ended up at the Freiherr-vom-Stein Gesamtschule in Eppstein, about 30 kilometers from Frankfurt.

Charva parked his car near the school, leaving 160 rounds of ammunition, a bag and handcuffs behind. He then entered the building with two semi-automatic pistols, a 9×19mm Smith & Wesson Model 59 and a 7.65mm-caliber Astra, as well as seven additional magazines.

At about 10:45 a.m. he arrived at room 213, where Franz-Adolf Gehlhaar taught English to a sixth grade class. Charva fired a shot at Gehlhaar, missing him, and immediately retreated out of the classroom, only to re-enter. When Gehlhaar confronted the gunman, he told him not to shoot the children, but take him instead. He fired seven shots at the teacher, hitting him in the stomach, face and left arm. As soon as Gehlhaar lay on the floor gravely wounded, Charva began shooting the children, killing three of them and wounding another thirteen, four of them critically. Alarmed by the gunshots, teacher Hans-Peter Schmitt rushed into the classroom, trying to help, but was also shot and killed, as was Gisbert Beck, an unarmed police officer who was at the school instructing students on traffic safety.
 
When police arrived at the scene they tried to calm Charva down, but the gunman simply yelled at them and continued shooting. At about 11:15 a.m. Charva retreated into a classroom opposite the English class where the attack began and committed suicide by shooting himself in the mouth. The autopsy of his body later showed that he had acted under the influence of alcohol.

In all Charva had fired about forty shots, killed 5 people and injured another 14. Additionally, 30 children suffered from shock.

Initially, there was some confusion that Charva might have known the wounded teacher, as shortly before the shooting started someone had asked for Gehlhaar, though it was later found that the person was not the gunman.

Victims
The five people killed by Charva are:

 Stephanie Hermann, 12 
 Javier Martinez, 11 
 Gabriele Siebert, 12  
 Hans-Peter Schmitt, 36, teacher
 Gisbert Beck, 45, police officer

Perpetrator

Karel Charva, a native from Prague, Czechoslovakia and follower of Alexander Dubček, fled to West Germany in 1968 when the Soviet-led intervention ended the Prague Spring. After living in a camp at Zirndorf for a while he was finally granted the status of a political refugee in 1971. Stating he was a psychologist and wanting to become a teacher, Charva moved to Mörfelden-Walldorf and later to Darmstadt, where he began working as a taxicab driver for a Frankfurt cab company. In 1976 he was arrested and convicted for loosening the nuts on the front wheels of two cars. Though the motives behind this deed are unknown, it was suggested that it might have been politically motivated.

Living in Frankfurt since 1981, where he found a job as security guard, Charva was known by his neighbours as a loner and very reserved person, who spent whole nights typing on his typewriter and studying chemistry and mathematics, apparently to become a teacher. He was also a member of a local gun club and legally purchased the two weapons used in the shooting in 1981. In the last weeks of his life he was described as increasingly aggressive.
The motive behind Charva's shooting remains unknown, though it was speculated that pent-up anger and frustration about failing to bring his aspiring attempts to qualify as a teacher to fruition could have been a cause.

See also
List of rampage killers (school massacres)
Emsdetten school shooting
Ansbach school attack

References

External links
Madman opens fire in school, kills five, Wilmington Morning Star (June 4, 1983)
West Germans hold memorial for school shooting victims, The Ledger (June 9, 1983)
Gunman kills 5, self, at school in Germany, Pittsburgh Post-Gazette (June 4, 1983)
5 die as gunman blasts schoolroom, Ocala Star-Banner (June 4, 1983)
Police say attacker knew teacher, Ocala Star-Banner (June 5, 1983)
Six die in school shooting, The Gainesville Sun (June 4, 1983)
Classroom shooting spree: man a recluse, New Straits Times (June 7, 1983)
Gunman called a friendless loner, Sarasota Herald-Tribune (June 6, 1983)

School shootings in Germany
Mass shootings in Germany
Mass murder in 1983
1983 crimes in Germany
Deaths by firearm in Germany
Massacres in Germany
Murder–suicides in Germany
School massacres
Spree shootings in Germany
1983 in West Germany
1980s in Hesse
Crime in Hesse
June 1983 events in Europe
1983 mass shootings in Europe
School killings in Germany